A macrocyst is an aggregate of cells of Dictyostelids formed during sexual reproduction enclosed in a cellulose wall.

If two amoebae of different mating types are present in a dark and wet environment, they can fuse during aggregation to form a giant cell. The giant cell will then engulf the other cells in the aggregate and encase the whole aggregate in a thick, cellulose wall to protect it. This is known as a macrocyst. Inside the macrocyst, the giant cell divides first through meiosis, then through mitosis to produce many haploid amoebae that will be released to feed as normal amoebae would.

See also 
 Life cycle and reproduction of Dictyostelium discoideum

References 

Mycetozoa